Josef Strillinger was a West German luger who competed during the 1950s. He won three medals in the men's doubles event at the FIL World Luge Championships with two golds (1957, 1958) and one bronze (1955).

Strillinger also won a bronze medal in the men's singles event at the 1954 European luge championships in Davos, Switzerland.

References

List of European luge champions 

German male lugers
Possibly living people
Year of birth missing
20th-century German people